Balkar is a town (belde) and municipality in the Gölbaşı District, Adıyaman Province, Turkey. Its population is 2,091 (2021).

References

Towns in Turkey
Populated places in Adıyaman Province
Gölbaşı District, Adıyaman